Local Color is the second album by blues/jazz pianist and vocalist Mose Allison which was recorded in 1957 and released on the Prestige label. The album features the first recording of Allison's "Parchman Farm" which was later covered by John Mayall & the Bluesbreakers on their album Blues Breakers with Eric Clapton.

Reception

Scott Yanow, in his review for Allmusic, says "Allison performs eight instrumentals in a trio... displaying his unusual mixture of country blues and bebop... However it is his vocals on "Lost Mind" and particularly the classic "Parchman Farm" that are most memorable". The Penguin Guide to Jazz praised the rendition of "Lost Mind" and highlighted a rare instance of Allison playing trumpet, on "Trouble in Mind".

Track listing 
All compositions by Mose Allison except as indicated
 "Carnival" - 2:59     
 "Parchman Farm" - 3:17     
 "Crepuscular Air" - 3:43     
 "Mojo Woman" - 4:04     
 "Town" - 3:21     
 "Trouble in Mind" (Richard M. Jones) - 3:13     
 "Lost Mind" (Percy Mayfield) - 3:31     
 "I'll Never Be Free" (Bennie Benjamin, George Weiss) - 5:36
 "Don't Ever Say Goodbye" (Duke Ellington) - 3:12     
 "Ain't You a Mess" - 2:40

Personnel 
Mose Allison - piano, trumpet on 6, vocals
Addison Farmer - bass
Nick Stabulas - drums

References 

Mose Allison albums
1958 albums
Prestige Records albums
Albums produced by Bob Weinstock
Albums recorded at Van Gelder Studio